Telenor Microfinance Bank, formerly Tameer Microfinance Bank, is a Pakistani microfinance bank which is based in Karachi, Pakistan. It was founded in 2006 by Nadeem Hussain as Tameer Microfinance Bank which was later acquired by Telenor Pakistan.

Telenor Microfinance Bank is jointly owned by Telenor Group, the leading telecommunications company across the Nordics and Asia with 186 million customers, and Ant Group, an affiliate company of Alibaba Group and the operator of a digital lifestyle platform, Alipay. With a distribution network of over 150 thousand agents and touchpoints nationwide, Telenor Microfinance Bank is one of the largest microfinance banks of Pakistan. Mohammad Mudassar Aqil is the current President & CEO of the bank.

History
In November 2008, Telenor Pakistan acquired 51 percent shares in Tameer Microfinance Bank for $12.5 million. In March 2016, Telenor Pakistan acquired the remaining 49 percent shares of Tameer MicroFinance Bank for an undisclosed sum.

In March 2018, a memorandum of understanding was signed between the Telenor Group and the Ant Group for a strategic partnership agreement according to which the Ant Financial was to invest $184.5 million in the micro-finance bank. In November 2018, the Competition Commission of Pakistan approved Alipay's – a subsidiary of Ant Financial – acquisition of 45% shareholding in the micro-finance bank for $184.5 million.

In November 2021, the board of MCB bank approved to conduct due diligence to buy 55% shares of Telenor Microfinance Bank.

Financial Performance 
For the year 2021, Telenor Microfinance Bank has posted a loss of Rs 10 billion.

Products 
Easypaisa, Pakistan’s first mobile banking platform launched in 2009, is the only GSMA mobile money certified service in the country. Initially launched as a money transfer service.

Easypaisa is part of Telenor Microfinance Bank and operates as a branchless banking service.

See also
Other financial services operated by Telenor:
vcash, former e-wallet service in Malaysia
Mobi Banka in Serbia

References

Telenor
Alibaba Group
2008 mergers and acquisitions
Companies based in Karachi
Mergers and acquisitions of Pakistani companies
Microfinance banks in Pakistan
Pakistani subsidiaries of foreign companies
Joint ventures
Banks established in 2006
Pakistani companies established in 2006
Privately held companies of Pakistan